Tvarditsa is a town in Sliven Province, Southeastern Bulgaria. It is the administrative centre of the homonymous Tvarditsa Municipality. As of December 2018, the town has a population of 5,659 inhabitants.

Tvarditsa is located on the southern slopes of Stara Planina. The area around is known as the Tvarditsa Coal Basin, the only place in the country where soft coal is mined.

Tvarditsa Rocks in the South Shetland Islands, Antarctica are named after Tvarditsa. The Bessarabian Bulgarian village of Tvardiţa in Taraclia District, Moldova, was founded by refugees from Tvardisa, who named it after their ancestral town.

Population
As of December 2018, the town of Tvarditsa has 5,659 inhabitants, while the municipality of Tvarditsa has 13,413 inhabitants. Most inhabitants are ethnic Bulgarians (89%), followed by a large Romani minority (9%). The main faith is Orthodox Christianity.

Gallery

Notes

Populated places in Sliven Province
Towns in Bulgaria